Nobukatsu (written: 信雄 or 信勝) is a masculine Japanese given name. Notable people with the name include:

, Japanese academic
, Japanese samurai
, Japanese samurai

Japanese masculine given names